Go USA! is the fifth album of Japanese band Electric Eel Shock and was released in 2005 in the United States. This album has the same tracks as the Bitzcore release of the album Go Europe!. Go Europe! was released before Go USA! in 2004.

Tracks 1, 8, 9, 11, 12, 13, 14, 15, and 16 were recorded at Sound Studio Face, Tokyo, Japan by Electric Eel Shock. Tracks 2, 3, 4, 5, 6, 7, and 10 were recorded at 2 kHz, London, England by Sean Doherty. All tracks except 11, 14, and 15 were mixed and co-produced by Sean Doherty. Tracks 11, 14, and 15 were mixed and co-produced by Richard Narco. The album was mastered by Doug Shearer at Townhouse Studios, London, England.

Go USA! was released by Gearhead Records in the United States under exclusive license from Electric Eel Shock.

Track listing

Tracks 15 and 16 are Enhanced CD content (video clips).

Release history

Personnel
 Akihito Morimoto - Guitar/Vocals
 Kazuto Maekawa - Bass
 Tomoharu "Gian" Ito - Drums
 Bob Slayer - Manager

Electric Eel Shock albums
2005 albums